Loyola Greyhounds basketball may refer to either of the basketball teams that represent the Loyola University Maryland:
Loyola Greyhounds men's basketball
Loyola Greyhounds women's basketball